This is a list of members of the South Australian House of Assembly from 1912 to 1915, as elected at the 1912 state election:

 Murray Liberal MHA William Jamieson died on 15 October 1912. Liberal candidate Harry Dove Young won the resulting by-election on 23 November.
 Alexandra Liberal MHA William Blacker died on 22 November 1913. Liberal candidate George Laffer won the resulting by-election on 20 December.

References

Members of South Australian parliaments by term
20th-century Australian politicians